Jacob Rupertus (1822/1823 – 1921) was an American handgun designer and manufacturer. He was born in Bavaria and died in Laurel Springs, New Jersey, on February 14, 1921. He was married to Caroline Bechtel circa 1849. Caroline was born Feb 12, 1831 in Leiterswiller, Bas-Rhin, Alsace, France and died Feb 26, 1911 also in Laurel Springs. They were buried in the now defunct American Mechanics Cemetery in Philadelphia. This Jacob Rupertus should not be confused with another Jacob Rupertus 1827-1900 who also lived in Philadelphia, but was not involved in gun manufacturing.

Rupertus founded the Rupertus Patented Pistol Manufacturing Company in Philadelphia, 1924 North 4th Street, which was active between 1859 and 1899.

On July 19, 1864 he received the US patent No.43.606 for a revolver with a rotating multi-shot barrel group (pepper-box).

External links 
 Pepperbox of Jacob Rupertus, Patent US43606
 Jacob Rupertus Revolver at antiquearmsinc.com, Patent US121199
 Shotgun 12 gauge of Jacob Rupertus, Patent US 209925
 Revolver of Jacob Rupertus, Patent US121199

References 

This article is based on a translation of Jacob Rupertus from 04:31, June 29, 2007

1825 births
1921 deaths
19th-century American inventors
Firearm manufacturers of the United States
People from Philadelphia
Bavarian emigrants to the United States